Anti-LGBT curriculum laws, sometimes referred to as don't say gay laws or no promo homo laws, are laws approved by various U.S. states that prohibit or limit the mention or discussion of homosexuality and transgender identity in public schools. In theory, these laws mainly apply to sex ed courses, but they can also be applied to other parts of the school curriculum as well as to extracurricular activities such as sports and organizations such as gay–straight alliances. In July 2022, a wave of anti-LGBT curriculum resurgence saw ten such laws beginning to take effect in six different states. Some states enacting these new laws appear to have mirrored similar laws from other states.

Historically, explicit anti-LGBT curriculum laws have been largely eliminated in the United States and are only found in six US states as of 2022: Louisiana, Mississippi, Oklahoma, Texas, Florida (for kindergarten to grade 3 and instruction that is considered "not age appropriate or developmentally appropriate for students" in any grade), and Alabama (for kindergarten to grade 5). Five other states (Montana, Arizona, Arkansas, Tennessee and Florida) require parental notification of instruction on LGBTQ issues and allows parents to opt-out of such instruction.

State laws

Louisiana
"No sex education course offered in the public schools of the state shall utilize any sexually explicit materials depicting male or female homosexual activity ... The major emphasis of any sex education instruction offered in the public schools of this state shall be to encourage sexual abstinence between unmarried persons and any such instruction shall: ... Emphasize abstinence from sexual activity outside of marriage as the expected standard for all school-age children." La. R.S. § 17:281. State Legislator Dodie Horton introduced HB 837 in the 2022 Legislative Session which would prohibit any public school teacher, employee or presenter from discussing sexual orientation or gender identity, it died in committee. As of 2022, no state law in place prevents such discussions from taking place.

Mississippi
"Abstinence-only education shall remain the state standard for any sex-related education taught in the public schools.  For purposes of this section, abstinence-only education includes any type of instruction or program which, at an appropriate age ... [t]eaches the current state law related to sexual conduct, including forcible rape, statutory rape, ... and homosexual activity ... and teaches that a mutually faithful, monogamous relationship in the context of marriage is the only appropriate setting for sexual intercourse." Miss. Code § 37-13-171.

Oklahoma
"AIDS prevention education shall specifically teach students that: 1. engaging in homosexual activity, promiscuous sexual activity, intravenous drug use or contact with contaminated blood products is now known to be primarily responsible for contact with the AIDS virus; 2. avoiding the activities specified in paragraph 1 of this subsection is the only method of preventing the spread of the virus." 70 Okla. Stat. § 11-103.3.

Texas
Texas Statute Books currently contain two Anti-LGBT curriculum laws:

"The materials in the education programs intended for persons younger than 18 years of age must: (1) emphasize sexual abstinence before marriage and fidelity in marriage as the expected standard ... and (2) state that homosexual conduct is not an acceptable lifestyle and is a criminal offense under Section 21.06, Penal Code." Tex. Health & Safety Code § 85.007.

"Course materials and instruction relating to sexual education or sexually transmitted diseases should include: [...] (8) emphasis, provided in a factual manner and from a public health perspective, that homosexuality is not a lifestyle acceptable to the general public and that homosexual conduct is a criminal offense under Section 21.06, Penal Code." Tex. Health & Safety Code § 163.002.

In November 2020, the Texas Board of Education had an opportunity to update these laws, but the Republican majority voted not to in a 9-6 vote. Despite this, they did vote in favor of updating the anti-bullying policy to include language about "sexual bullying", although it was unclear if this included LGBT students or not, and when the Conservative board members were questioned what the term meant, they could not give a straight definition.

As of March 2022, the Texas Anti-LGBT curriculum laws remain on the Statute books.

Florida 

In March 2022, the Florida Legislature passed House Bill 1557, the Parental Rights in Education Act, often referred to as the "Don't Say Gay" bill by its opponents. Governor of Florida Ron DeSantis signed the bill into law on March 28, 2022. The law goes into effect from July 1 The law prohibits classroom instruction on sexual orientation or gender identity from kindergarten to grade 3 in Florida public school districts, or instruction on sexual orientation or gender identity in a manner that is not "age appropriate or developmentally appropriate for students" in any grade. The preamble of the law also mentions "classroom discussion" of these topics, dividing legal scholars if that would be included within the scope of the law. It also allows parents and teachers to sue any school district if they believe this policy is violated, with school districts covering the cost of the lawsuit. The bill additionally prevents school districts from withholding information about a child’s "mental, emotional, or physical well-being" from their parents. Due to the "Don't Say Gay" nickname, some commentators and social media users incorrectly believed the bill banned mentioning the word "gay" in school classrooms. The bill does not verbatim prohibit the use of the word "gay;" it prohibits classroom instruction or "discussion" on “sexual orientation or gender identity."

The bill is currently being contested by a lawsuit in the United States District Court for the Northern District of Florida alleging intrusions on the First Amendment , violates Title IX, and Due Process. In October 2022, federal judge Wendy Berger dismissed the suit, for lack of standing, which challenged the legislation effective since July 1. She gave the plaintiffs 14 days to file a revised lawsuit.

Alabama 
In April 2021, Alabama governor Kay Ivey signed a repeal of a 1992 law that required "Course materials and instruction that relate to sexual education or sexually transmitted diseases should include ... an emphasis, in a factual manner and from a public health perspective, that homosexuality is not a lifestyle acceptable to the general public and that homosexual conduct is a criminal offense under the laws of the state."  Ala. Code § 16-40A-2. This itself, however, was undone in 2022, as Ivey re-signed similar legislation prohibiting LGBT instruction in 2022 after Florida passed its law.

Repealed laws

Arizona 
In April 2019, the Arizona State Legislature passed (House vote 55–5 and Senate vote 19–10) and the Governor of Arizona signed a repeal of the 1991 HIV law (ARS § 15-716) that prohibited AIDS and HIV-related "instruction which: 1. Promotes a homosexual life-style. 2. Portrays homosexuality as a positive alternative life-style. 3. Suggests that some methods of sex are safe methods of homosexual sex." Due to several court cases running, the constitutionality of the law was questioned. The repeal went into effect on July 1, 2019.

North Carolina
In 2006 with the passage of 2006 N.C. Sess. Laws 264,§ 54(a)–(c), the North Carolina State Legislature amended N.C. Gen. Stat. § 115C-81(e1)(3) to remove the prohibition of discussing homosexuality.

Utah
On October 21, 2016, Equality Utah filed a lawsuit with the U.S. District Court for the District of Utah against the Utah State Board of Education to strike down Utah Code § 53A-13-101(1)(c)(iii)(A). On March 8, 2017, the Utah State Legislature passed SB196, which removes the phrase "the advocacy of homosexuality" from the law. On March 20, 2017, Governor Gary Herbert signed SB196 into law. The repeal went into effect on July 1, 2017.

The repealed statute stated "[T]he materials adopted by a local school board ... shall be based upon recommendations of the school district's Curriculum Materials Review Committee that comply with state law and state board rules emphasizing abstinence before marriage and fidelity after marriage, and prohibiting instruction in the advocacy of homosexuality."  Utah Code § 53A-13-101.

Overturned laws

South Carolina 
On March 11, 2020, the US District Court of South Carolina ruled in GSA v. Spearman that South Carolina's anti-LGBT curriculum law "cannot satisfy any level of judicial review under the Equal Protection Clause". The Court ordered that "[t]he Superintendent and the Superintendent's officers, assigns, successors, agents, employees, attorneys, and other persons who are acting in concert or in participation with each or any of them, are permanently enjoined from enforcing, applying, or relying on S.C. Code. § 59-32-30(A)(5)." This rendered S.C. Code. § 59-32-30(A)(5) unenforceable.

The judgement was a consent decree. The defendant, the superintendent of the South Carolina Department of Education, agreed that the law was likely unconstitutional after receiving advice from South Carolina Attorney General Alan Wilson and decided to accept the Court's terms.

Proposed laws

Federal 

In October 2022, 32 Republicans co-sponsored Louisiana representative Mike Johnson's Stop the Sexualization of Children Act, modeled after the 2022 Florida Parental Rights in Education Act, with it also earning the nickname of the "national Don't Say Gay law." It would use denial of federal funds to enforce similar rules.

Alabama 
On April 7, 2022, an amendment to House Bill 322, which requires all multiple occupancy restrooms or changing areas designated for student use in public K-12 schools to be used by individuals based on their biological sex, was offered and passed in the Alabama Senate. On page 2, after line 27 of the original bill, it amends "An individual or group of individuals providing classroom instruction to students in kindergarten through the fifth grade at a public K-12 school shall not engage in classroom discussion or provide classroom instruction regarding sexual orientation or gender identity in a manner that is not age appropriate or developmentally appropriate for students in accordance with state standards." The bill was signed by Governor Kay Ivey in April 2022 and is scheduled to go into effect this summer.

Ohio 
On April 4, 2022, House Bill 616 was introduced to the Ohio General Assembly by Mike Loychik and Jean Schmidt. Starting on page 3, line 51, it says "No school district, community school, STEM school, nonpublic school that enrolls students who are participating in a state scholarship program, or any employee or other third party representing a school district or school shall do either of the following: (a) With respect to a student in any of grades kindergarten through three, teach, use, or provide any curriculum or instructional materials on sexual orientation or gender identity; (b) With respect to a student in any of grades four through twelve, teach, use, or provide any curriculum or instructional materials on sexual orientation or gender identity in any manner that is not age-appropriate or developmentally appropriate for students in accordance with state standards. [...]"

South Carolina 
On January 11, 2022 House Bill 4555, called the "Parental Bill of Rights", was introduced into the South Carolina General Assembly. If the proposed bill passes, the bill would require schools to provide "...procedures for a parent to withdraw his child from any portion of the school district's comprehensive health education program required pursuant to Chapter 32, Title 59 that relates to sex education or instruction in acquired immune deficiency syndrome education or any instruction regarding sexuality..."

North Carolina 
On April 29, 2021 House Bill 755, called the Parental Bill of Rights", was introduced into the North Carolina General Assembly. If the proposed bill passes, the bill would prevent inclusion in the curriculum of instruction of children in grades kindergarten through third grade about sexual orientation or gender identity.

See also
 LGBT rights in the United States
 Censorship of LGBT issues
 Russian gay propaganda law
 LGBT sex education
 Education and the LGBT community
 2022 Hungarian LGBTQ in education referendum
 Acquired homosexuality
 Homosexual seduction

References

LGBT law in the United States
United States education law
Textbook controversies
Censorship of LGBT issues
Education controversies in the United States
LGBT and education
Censorship in the United States